The Abell 520 galaxy cluster possesses an unusual substructure resulting from a major merger. It has been popularly nicknamed The Train Wreck Cluster, due to its chaotic structure, and is classified as a Bautz-Morgan type III cluster. Analysis of the motions of 293 galaxies in the cluster field suggested that Abell 520 was a cluster forming at the crossing of three filaments of the large scale structure.

The surprising substructure of Abell 520 was reported in 2007 from a weak gravitational lensing study based on Canada-France-Hawaii-Telescope (CFHT) imaging data. It was surprising at first, because the study found the "dark core" with a significant amount of mass in the region, where there is no concentration of bright cluster galaxies. No conventional understanding of dark matter could explain this peculiar concentration of dark matter. At the time, some thought that the substructure may arise from non-gravitational interaction of dark matter.

However, in the year 2012 two international teams of astronomers published conflicting results on Abell 520. While one study based on the Wide Field Planetary Camera 2 (WFPC2) on Hubble Space Telescope (HST) confirmed the previous claim of the dark core in Abell 520, the other study based on the Advanced Camera for Surveys (ACS) did not support the claim. Although the latter group found the "dark core", they also found luminous matter, which made the "dark core" not so dark—in particular, just as bright as any other galaxy with dark matter.

In 2014, a study of the ACS images by the original team claims to again have found evidence of a dark core, but is in a different location from the first two studies.  A subsequent analysis by an independent third team of the gravitational shear catalogs of the two competing ACS analyses indicates marginal evidence for the core in both data sets and the authors "do not consider A520 as posing a significant challenge to the collisionless dark matter scenario."

See also
 Abell catalogue
 Bullet Cluster
 List of Abell clusters
 List of galaxy clusters

References

External links
 Universe Today, Galaxy Cluster Collision Creates a Dark Matter Core
 Dark Matter Core Defies Explanation

0520
Galaxy clusters
Abell richness class 3
Dark matter